is a Japanese novelist. She has won the Akutagawa Prize, the Kawabata Yasunari Prize, and the  Tanizaki Prize, and her work has been adapted for film.

Biography
After graduation from Shinjuku High School and Waseda University, she worked as a saleswoman for a major household equipment company and, as is common in Japanese corporate life, was transferred several times to various localities. Treatment for cyclic psychosis led to her writing.

Her works, which focus on human relations, have been nominated for and received literary awards. She was recipient of the 96th Bungakukai New Face Award and a nominee for the 129th Akutagawa Prize for her first volume, in 2003. The book was later adapted into the 2005 Ryūichi Hiroki film It's Only Talk. Itoyama won the Akutagawa Prize in January 2006 for her short story "Oki de matsu".  An English translation of her "Oki de matsu" appeared in the April 2007 issue of Words Without Borders under the title "Waiting in the Offing." Her book  was adapted into a 2007 film starring Minami Hinase. An English version of the book, translated by Charles de Wolf, was published in 2013 under the title In Pursuit of Lavender.

An English translation of It's Only Talk was published by The Japan Times in March 2009. In 2010 her novel  was adapted into a film by Shusuke Kaneko. In 2016 Itoyama won the 52nd Tanizaki Prize for her 2015 book .

She has been praised for her ability to describe provincial scenery and represent regional accents and dialects, reflecting the characters' image, even though she was brought up in Tokyo. She explains that she learned them through repeated company transfers all over Japan.

Recognition
 2004 55th MEXT Award for New Artists
 2004 30th Kawabata Yasunari Prize
 2006 134th Akutagawa Prize (2005下)
 2016 52nd Tanizaki Prize

Bibliography

Books in Japanese
 , Bungeishunjū, 2004,  (won the 96th Bungakukai New Face Award, nominated for the 129th Akutagawa Prize) 
 , Shinchosha, 2004,  (nominated for the 130th Akutagawa Prize, also won  the Minister of Education and Science's Art Encouragement Prize for New Artists, in book form)  
 , Kodansha, 2004,  (won the 30th Kawabata Yasunari Prize)
 , Chuokoron Shinsha, 2005,  (nominated for the 133rd Naoki Prize and  New Face Award of the 27th Noma Prize for Literature)
 , Nigensha, 2005, 
 , Kadokawa Shoten, 2005, 
 , Bungeishunjū, 2006,  (won the 134th Akutagawa Prize)
 includes 勤労感謝の日 Kinrō kansha no hi (Labor Thanksgiving Day), nominated for the 131st Akutagawa Prize
 , Shinchosha, 2008, 
 , Bungeishunjū, 2014, 
 , Shinchosha, 2015,

Selected works in English
 "Waiting in the Offing," trans. Charles de Wolf, Words Without Borders, April 2007 issue
 It's Only Talk, trans. Raquel Hill, The Japan Times, 2009, 
 In Pursuit of Lavender, trans. Charles de Wolf, Anthem Press, 2013,

References

External links
 Akiko Itoyama at J'Lit Books from Japan 
 Synopsis of In Pursuit of Lavender (Tobo kusotawake) at JLPP (Japanese Literature Publishing Project) 

20th-century Japanese novelists
21st-century Japanese novelists
Akutagawa Prize winners
1966 births
People from Setagaya
Living people